Rohallion railway station was a private station from 1860 to 1864 on the Perth and Dunkeld Railway.

History 
The station opened in February 1860 by the Perth and Dunkeld Railway. It was a private station, built solely for William Drummond Stewart. It closed in October 1864 when trains stopped calling at the platform.

References

External links 
RailScot

Disused railway stations in Perth and Kinross
Railway stations in Great Britain opened in 1860
Railway stations in Great Britain closed in 1864
1860 establishments in Scotland
1864 disestablishments in Scotland
Former private railway stations